Communauté intercommunale des Villes solidaires (CIVIS) is the communauté d'agglomération, an intercommunal structure, centred on the city of Saint-Pierre. It is located in Réunion, an overseas department and region of France. It was created in December 2002. Its area is 378.1 km2. Its population was 181,704 in 2018, of which 84,961 in Saint-Pierre proper.

Composition
The communauté d'agglomération consists of the following 6 communes:
Les Avirons
Cilaos
L'Étang-Salé
Petite-Île
Saint-Louis
Saint-Pierre

References

Villes solidaires
Villes solidaires